The 1991 European motorcycle Grand Prix was the eighth round of the 1991 Grand Prix motorcycle racing season. It took place on the weekend of 14–16 June 1991 at the Circuito del Jarama.

500 cc race report
Kevin Schwantz on pole. Mick Doohan gets a very good start from Wayne Rainey, Wayne Gardner, Schwantz, Eddie Lawson and John Kocinski.

Doohan and Rainey pulling away; Rainey pulls a draft pass and starts dropping Doohan. Schwantz is drifting both tires and dramatically getting the bike sideways.

500 cc classification

References

European motorcycle Grand Prix
European
European Motorcycle